The 39th Kentucky Infantry Regiment was an infantry regiment that served in the Union Army during the American Civil War.

Service
The 39th Kentucky Infantry Regiment was organized at Peach Orchard in Lawrence County, Kentucky, on November 18, 1862.  It mustered in for a three-year enlistment on February 16, 1863, under the command of Colonel John Dils, Jr.  Although the regiment was mounted, it was never designated as mounted infantry.

The regiment was attached to District of Eastern Kentucky, Department of the Ohio, to June 1863. 1st Brigade, 4th Division, XXIII Corps, Department of the Ohio, to August 1863. District of Eastern Kentucky, 1st Division, XXIII Corps, to April 1864. 1st Brigade, 1st Division, District of Kentucky, 5th Division, XXIII Corps, to July 1864. 3rd Brigade, 1st Division, District of Kentucky, to December 1864. Louisa, Kentucky, District and Department of Kentucky, to September 1865.

The 39th Kentucky Infantry mustered out of service on September 15, 1865.

Detailed service
Action near Piketon, Ky., November 5, 1862. Wireman's Shoals, Big Sandy River, December 4. Skirmishes in Floyd County December 4 and near Prestonburg December 4–5. Near Prestonburg December 31. Near Louisa, Ky., March 25–26, 1863. Piketon April 13 and 15. Beaver Creek, Floyd County, June 27. Mouth of Coal Run, Pike County, July 2. Expedition from Beaver Creek into southwest Virginia July 3–11. Pond Creek July 6. Clark's Neck and Carter County August 27. Marrowbone Creek September 22. Terman's Ferry January 9, 1864. Laurel Creek, W. Va., February 12. Operations in eastern Kentucky March 28-April 16. Forks of Beaver March 31. Brushy Creek April 7. Paintsville April 13. Half Mountain, Magoffin County, April 14. Saylersville April 16. Expedition from Louisa to Rockhouse Creek May 9–13 (Company B). Pond Creek, Pike County, May 16. Pike County May 18. Operations against Morgan May 31-June 20. Mt. Sterling June 9. Cynthiana June 12. Burbridge's Expedition into southwest Virginia September 20-October 17. Saltville October 2. Stoneman's Expedition into southwest Virginia December 10–29. Bristol, Tenn., December 13. Arlington, Va., December 15. Near Marlon, Va., December 17–18. Saltville, Va., December 20–21. Capture and destruction of salt works. Duty in the Sandy Valley and in eastern Kentucky guarding and protecting the country until September 1865.

Casualties
The regiment lost a total of 234 men during service; 3 officers and 24 enlisted men killed or mortally wounded, 3 officers and 194 enlisted men died of disease.

Commanders
 Colonel John Dils, Jr.

See also

 List of Kentucky Civil War Units
 Kentucky in the Civil War

References
 Dyer, Frederick H.  A Compendium of the War of the Rebellion (Des Moines, IA:  Dyer Pub. Co.), 1908.
Attribution

External links
 History, roster, biographies, and photos of the 39th Kentucky Infantry (Archived 2009-10-22)
 Alphabetical Roster of the 39th Regiment Kentucky Volunteer Infantry (Mirrored from Geocities 2009-10-22)
 Biographies of some of the men who served in 39th Regiment Kentucky Volunteer Infantry (Mirrored from Geocities 2009-10-22)

Military units and formations established in 1862
Military units and formations disestablished in 1865
Units and formations of the Union Army from Kentucky
Lawrence County, Kentucky
1862 establishments in Kentucky